The 2003 Meistriliiga was the 13th season of the Meistriliiga, the top Estonian league for association football clubs, since its establishment in 1992.

Flora won their 7th Meistriliiga title.

League table

Relegation play-off

Valga won 5–2 on aggregate and retained their Meistriliiga spot for the 2004 season.

Results
Each team played every opponent four times, twice at home and twice on the road, for a total of 36 games.

First half of season

Second half of season

Top scorers

See also
 2002–03 Estonian Cup
 2003–04 Estonian Cup
 2003 Esiliiga

References

External links
 

Meistriliiga seasons
1
Estonia
Estonia